Michael Sloan Richardson (born 20 August 1969) is a Scottish former cricketer.

Richardson was born at Glasgow in August 1969. He was educated at Hyndland Secondary School, before matriculating to the University of Edinburgh. A club cricketer for 	West of Scotland and Clydesdale, Richardson made his debut for Scotland against Ireland at Dundee in 1992. He played twice more for Scotland in 1994, making a first-class appearance against Ireland at Glasgow, and a List A one-day appearance against Sussex at Hove in the 1994 Benson & Hedges Cup. He took four wickets in first-class cricket, taking two wickets in both matches.

References

External links
 

1969 births
Living people
Cricketers from Glasgow
People educated at Hyndland Secondary School
Alumni of the University of Edinburgh
Scottish cricketers